The Speyer wine bottle (or Römerwein) is a sealed vessel, presumed to contain liquid wine, and so named because it was unearthed from a Roman tomb found near Speyer, Germany.  It is considered the world's oldest known bottle of wine.

History
The Speyer wine bottle most likely holds wine, and was originally found in 1867, in what is now the Rhineland-Palatinate region of Germany near Speyer, one of the oldest settlements in the area.  The artifact has since become known as "the world's oldest existing bottle of wine".  The bottle has been dated between 325 and 350 AD and is the oldest known unopened bottle of wine in the world. Since its discovery, it has been exhibited at the Wine Museum section of the Historical Museum of the Palatinate in Speyer, always displayed in the same location within the museum. The "Römerwein" is housed in the museum's Tower Room. It is a  glass vessel with amphora-like "shoulders," yellow-green in color, with dolphin-shaped handles.

Discovery
The bottle was discovered during an excavation of a 4th-century AD Roman nobleman's tomb. The tomb contained two sarcophagi, one holding the body of a man and one a woman. One source says the man was a Roman legionary and the wine was a provision for his celestial journey. Of the six glass bottles in the woman's sarcophagus and the ten vessels in the man's sarcophagus, only one still contained a liquid.  There is a clear liquid in the bottom third, and a mixture similar to rosin above.

Wine preservation
While it has reportedly lost its ethanol content, analysis is consistent with at least part of the liquid having been wine. The wine was infused with a mixture of herbs. The preservation of the wine is attributed to the large amount of thick olive oil, added to the bottle to seal the wine off from air, along with a hot wax seal. Petronius (c. 2766 AD), in his work Satyricon, writes of plaster sealed bottles, and this one is analogous.  The use of glass in the bottle is unusual, however, as typically Roman glass was too fragile to be dependable over time.

While scientists have considered accessing the liquid to further analyze the content, as of 2023 the bottle has remained unopened, because of concerns about how the liquid would react when exposed to air. The museum's curator, Ludger Tekampe, has stated he has seen no variation in the bottle in the last 25 years.

See also

Ancient Rome and wine
Storage of wine

Notes

References

External links
Wine Museum home page

4th-century artefacts
Bottles
Fermented drinks
History of wine
Oenology
Speyer
Viticulture
Wine packaging and storage
1867 archaeological discoveries